Shawn Spikes Jr. (March 15, 1996-June 11, 2019) was a professional American thoroughbred jockey. At Golden Gate Fields, Spikes had a total of 141 starts and 3 career wins. Spikes also won a number of horse races in the California State Fair county horse racing circuit.

Career
Three years after graduating high school, on March 13, 2016, Sean Spikes won his first thoroughbred race, riding the horse 'Game Seeker' in Race 1 at Golden Gate Fields.

Education

Sean Spikes attended Gateway High School in San Francisco, California and graduated in 2013.

Disappearance and death
On Tuesday, June 11, 2019, Spikes was boating with friends at Lake Del Valle in unincorporated Alameda County, south of Livermore.  Authorities later said it was not clear if Spikes fell, or jumped into the water. It was also not immediately clear if Spikes knew how to swim, or wore a life jacket. East Bay Regional Park District police and firefighters responded to the scene and were joined by the Alameda County Fire Department and Sheriff’s Department divers to conduct a search, authorities said. Searchers used a helicopter and boats before calling off the search just after midnight. The search resumed later Wednesday morning, and Spikes’ body was found before noon in more than 40 feet of water, authorities said. Authorities said his relatives were at the lake when he was found.

Legacy

Commemorating Spikes on September 22nd, 2021 - friend, a former Gateway High School classmate, and recording artist, Marcus Orelias dedicated his third self-titled album to Spikes in an Instagram post stating in the later of the message; "R.I.P. to my brother, Shawn Spikes.
This next one [album] is for you."

References

1993 births
2019 deaths
American jockeys
People from San Francisco
Deaths by drowning in California